Pervy May (Berense May) is a rural locality (a village) in Safarovsky Selsoviet, Uchalinsky District, Bashkortostan, Russia. The population was 184 as of 2010. There are 2 streets.

Geography 
Pervy May is located 32 km northeast of Uchaly (the district's administrative centre) by road. Safarovo is the nearest rural locality.

References 

Rural localities in Uchalinsky District